Duke University School of Law (Duke Law School or Duke Law) is the law school of Duke University, a private research university in Durham, North Carolina. One of Duke's 10 schools and colleges, the School of Law is a constituent academic unit that began in 1868 as the Trinity College School of Law.  In 1924, following the renaming of Trinity College to Duke University, the school was renamed Duke University School of Law.

Duke Law is consistently ranked as one of the top law schools in the United States, and admits about 14.5 percent of applicants. The law school is one of the "T14" law schools that have consistently ranked within the top 14 law schools since U.S. News & World Report began publishing rankings.

According to Law.com, 91.36 percent of its 2018 graduating class were employed within 10 months, with a median starting salary in the private sector of $205,000. Duke's 2019 class bar passage rate was "almost 98 percent" — the second-highest bar passage rate in the country, after Harvard Law School. , Law School Transparency estimated debt-financed cost of attendance for three years is $329,609.

Reputation
Duke Law is routinely ranked within the top 14 law schools in the country, and is a member of the "T-14" law schools. It has never been ranked lower than 12th by U.S. News, or less than 7th by Above the Law. Duke Law is one of three T14 law schools to have graduated a President of the United States (Richard Nixon). Duke Law was ranked by Forbes as having graduated lawyers with the 2nd highest median mid-career salary amount. It is tied as the #8 best law school by the 2015 U.S. News overall law school Rankings. In 2017, The Times Higher Education World University Rankings listed Duke Law as the number one ranked law school in the world.

Admissions

The law school is one of few that have experienced an increase in law school applications despite an overall national decline of applications in recent years. For the class entering in the fall of 2014, 221 students enrolled out of 5,358 applicants. The 25th and 75th LSAT percentiles for the 2014 entering class were 166 and 170, respectively, with a median of 169 (top three percent of test takers worldwide). The 25th and 75th undergraduate GPA percentiles were 3.66 and 3.85, respectively, with a median of 3.77. The school has approximately 640 JD students and 75 students in the LLM and SJD programs.

History
The date of founding is generally considered to be 1868 or 1924.

However, in 1855 Trinity College, the precursor to Duke University, began offering lectures on (but not degrees in) Constitutional and International Law (during this time, Trinity was located in Randolph County, North Carolina).

In 1865, Trinity's Law Department was officially founded, while 1868 marked the official chartering of the School of Law. After a ten-year hiatus from 1894 to 1904, James B. Duke and Benjamin Newton Duke provided the endowment to reopen the school, with Samuel Fox Mordecai as its senior professor (by this time, Trinity College had relocated to Durham, North Carolina).  When Trinity College became part of the newly created Duke University upon the establishment of the Duke Endowment in 1924, the School of Law continued as the Duke University School of Law.  In 1930, the law school moved from the Carr Building on Duke's East Campus to a new location on the main quad of  West Campus.  During the three years preceding this move, the size of the law library tripled.  Among other well-known alumni, President Richard Nixon graduated from the school in 1937.  In 1963, the school moved to its present location on Science Drive in West Campus.

Law students at Duke University established the first U.S. Chapter of the International Criminal Court Student Network (ICCSN) in 2009.

Rankings

 1st Best Law School in the world, Times Higher Education (2018, 2nd in 2019)
 1st Best Law School by Above the Law (2022 and 2020)
 1st Best Professors according to the Princeton Review (2015 and 2016; 2nd in 2018-2020)
 1st Best Quality of Life according to the Princeton Review (2014, 2nd in 2015 and 2017)
 2nd Highest Median Mid-Career Salary
 2nd Best Classroom Experience according to Princeton Review (2015 and 2017, 3rd in 2018 and 2019, 4th in 2020)
 3rd Best Career Prospects according to Princeton Review (2020)
 3rd Best Law School (overall) according to the Best Law Schools ranking published by the National Jurist in 2013.
 5th Best Law School by Vault (2017)
 5th Best Law School by Business Insider
 5th Toughest to get into according to the Princeton Review
 5th Best Law School for BigLaw Hiring according to National Law Journal's "Go-To Law Schools" ranking
 6th Best Law School according to CNN Money
 6th Best Law School for Federal Clerkships according to National Jurist
 6th Best Law School for Moot Court according to National Jurist
 8th Best Law School as Ranked by Law Firm Recruiters
 10th Best in the world in the subject of law according to the Academic Ranking of World Universities in 2017
 10th Best for Standard of Living according to National Jurist
 Tied for 10th Best Law School by U.S. News Rankings
 12th Most Median Grant Money and Percentage of Students Receiving Grants according to National Jurist
 17th Best Law Review according to National Jurist
 19th Best Law School Library according to National Jurist

Facilities

The Trinity College School of Law was located in the Carr Building prior to the renaming of Trinity to Duke University in 1924. The Duke University Law School was originally housed in what is now the Languages Building, built in 1929 on Duke's West Campus quad.

The law school is presently located at the corner of Science Drive and Towerview Road and was constructed in the mid-1960s.

The first addition to the law school was completed in 1994, and a dark polished granite façade was added to the rear exterior of the building, enclosing the interior courtyard.

In 2004, Duke Law School broke ground on a building construction project officially completed in fall 2008. The renovation and addition offers larger and more technologically advanced classrooms, expanded community areas and eating facilities, known as the Star Commons, improved library facilities, and more study options for students.

Center for the Study of the Public Domain
Center for the Study of the Public Domain is a university center, aiming to redress the balance of academic study of intellectual property. In their analysis, academic focus has been too great on the incentives created by these rights, rather than the contribution to creativity from information which is not subject to them and also opposing the fair use, as they're focusing on Copyright Act of 1909 rather than Copyright Act of 1976

Law journals

Duke Law School publishes eight academic journals or law reviews, which are, in order of their founding:
Law and Contemporary Problems
Duke Law Journal
Alaska Law Review
Duke Journal of Comparative & International Law
Duke Environmental Law & Policy Forum
Duke Journal of Gender Law & Policy
Duke Law & Technology Review
Duke Journal of Constitutional Law & Public Policy

Law and Contemporary Problems is a quarterly, interdisciplinary, faculty-edited publication of the law school. Unlike traditional law reviews, L&CP uses a symposium format, generally publishing one symposium per issue on a topic of contemporary concern.  L&CP hosts an annual conference at the law school featuring the authors of one of the year’s four symposia. Established in 1933, it is the oldest journal published at the law school.

The Duke Law Journal was the first student-edited publication at Duke Law and publishes articles from leading scholars on topics of general legal interest.

Duke publishes the Alaska Law Review in a special agreement with the Alaska Bar Association, as the state of Alaska has no law school.

The Duke Journal of Gender Law & Policy (DJGLP) is the preeminent journal for its subject matter in the world.

The Duke Law & Technology Review has been published since 2001 and is devoted to examining the evolving intersection of law and technology.

The Duke Journal of Constitutional Law & Public Policy was founded by members of the Class of 2006.  Professors Erwin Chemerinsky and Christopher H. Schroeder served as the ConLaw journal's inaugural faculty advisors. Mikkelsen was the first editor-in-chief; the current editor-in-chief is Daniel Browning. The journal intends to fill a gap in law journal scholarship with a publication that could "cover constitutional developments and litigation, and their intersection with public policy". To ensure that the journal would remain timely, it established a partnership with the Duke Program in Public Law to produce "Supreme Court Commentaries" summarizing and explaining the impact recent cases could have on current issues. The journal publishes continually online and annually in print. It has sponsored speaker series and conferences exploring various issues in constitutional law and public policy.

The law school provides free online access to all of its academic journals, including the complete text of each journal issue dating back to January 1996 in a fully searchable HTML format and in Adobe Acrobat format (PDF).  New issues are posted on the web simultaneously with print publication.

In 2005, the law school was featured in the June 6 unveiling of the Open Access Law Program, an initiative of Creative Commons, for its work in pioneering open access to legal scholarship.

Joint-degree programs
The School offers joint-degree programs with the Duke University Graduate School, the Duke Divinity School, Fuqua School of Business, the Medical School, the Nicholas School of the Environment and Earth Sciences, the Pratt School of Engineering, and the Sanford School of Public Policy; and a JD/LLM dual degree program in International and Comparative Law. Approximately 25 percent of students are enrolled in joint-degree programs.

Employment 
According to Duke's 2017 ABA-required disclosures, 93.8 percent of the class of 2017 obtained full-time, long-term, JD-required employment nine months after graduation and not funded by the school – the highest number for any law school in the country. According to the NLJ, Duke ranks third among all law schools in the percentage of 2017 graduates working in federal clerkships or jobs at firms of 100 or more lawyers, a category NLJ terms "elite jobs". Duke also ranks fourth in federal clerkships.

Law School Transparency gave Duke Law the highest "Employment Score" in the country at 93.8 percent and lowest "Under-Employment Score" of 0.4 percent in 2017.

Costs
The total cost of attendance (indicating the cost of tuition, fees, and living expenses) at Duke for the 2015–2016 academic year is $80,937. The Law School Transparency estimated debt-financed cost of attendance for three years is $329,609.

Notable faculty

Current faculty

Notable faculty including a sitting Supreme Court Justice, a former United States Senator, 14 former Supreme Court clerks, a former federal judge and a former Judge Advocate General.

Samuel Alito, Associate Justice of the Supreme Court of the United States 
James Boyle, William Neal Reynolds Professor of Law (Intellectual Property and Legal Theory)
 James Earl Coleman, John S. Bradway Professor of Law (criminal law) and Director of the Center for Criminal Justice and Professional Responsibility
James C. Dever III, United States district judge of the United States District Court for the Eastern District of North Carolina
 Charles J. Dunlap Jr., Professor of the Practice of Law, Executive Director, Duke Center on Law, Ethics and National Security, Major General of the United States Air Force
 Thavolia Glymph, John Hope Franklin Visiting Professor of American Legal History
 Jack Knight, Frederic Cleaveland Professor of Law and Political Science
 David F. Levi, Dean, former Chief Judge of the United States District Court for the Eastern District of California (1994–2007), Fmr. Law Clerk to Supreme Court Justice Lewis Powell.
 H. Jefferson Powell, Professor of Law, Fmr. Principal Deputy Solicitor General of the United States 
 Arti K. Rai, Elvin R. Latty Professor of Law, Fmr. Administrator of the Office of External Affairs at the U.S. Patent and Trademark Office (2009-2010)
Sarah Bloom Raskin, Rubenstein Fellow, Fmr. United States Deputy Secretary of the Treasury (2014-2017), Fmr. Governor of the Federal Reserve (2010-2014)
 Christopher H. Schroeder, Charles S. Murphy Professor of Law (administrative law), Assistant Attorney General for the Office of Legal Policy (OLP), Fmr. Acting Assistant Attorney General for the Office of Legal Policy, Chief Counsel to the U.S. Senate Judiciary Committee
 Scott Silliman, Professor of the Practice of Law (national security law, military law, and the law of armed conflict)
 Michael Tigar, Professor of the Practice of Law (criminal law), Fmr. Law Clerk to Supreme Court Justice William Brennan,
 Jonathan B. Wiener, William R. and Thomas L. Perkins Professor of Law (Risk Analysis and Regulation)

Former faculty

 William Van Alstyne, former William R. & Thomas S. Perkins Chair of Law (Constitutional Law), 1974–2004 (deceased)
 Erwin Chemerinsky, former Alston & Bird Professor of Law (Constitutional Law), current Dean of the UC Berkeley School of Law
 Brainerd Currie, conflict of laws pioneer (deceased)
 Richard A. Danner, Archibald C. and Frances Fulk Rufty Research Professor of Law (former law librarian at University of Wisconsin–Madison) (deceased)
 Walter E. Dellinger III, Douglas Blount Maggs Professor of Law, Fmr. Acting Solicitor General of the United States (1996–1997), Fmr. Law Clerk to Supreme Court Justice Hugo Black (deceased)
 Robinson O. Everett, Professor of Criminal Law and Former Chief Judge of the United States Court of Military Appeals (deceased) (also professor at  Wake Forest University)
 Jedediah Purdy, former Robinson O. Everett Professor of Law
 Joseph Tyree Sneed III, former Dean (1971-1973); federal judge (1973-1987) (deceased)

Notable alumni

Political

 Willis Smith, 1912 – U.S. Senator from North Carolina
 William B. Umstead, '21 – former Governor of North Carolina,  U.S. Senator from North Carolina, U.S. Representative from North Carolina, Chairman of the North Carolina Democratic Party
 Richard Nixon, '37 – 37th President of the United States
 Nick Galifianakis, '53 – U.S. Representative from North Carolina
 Jim Courter '66 – former U.S. Representative from New Jersey
  Daniel T. Blue Jr. '73 – North Carolina State Senator and former Speaker of the North Carolina House of Representatives
 Kenneth Starr, '73 – United States Solicitor General, Independent Counsel during the Clinton Administration
 Bill Campbell, '77 – former Mayor of Atlanta, Georgia
 Jaime Aleman Healy, '79 – Panama's Ambassador to the United States
 Denise Majette, '79 – U.S. Representative from Georgia
 David Addington, '81 – Chief of Staff and former legal counsel to Vice President Dick Cheney
 Michael Dreeben, '81 – Deputy Solicitor General of the United States, and a member of the legal teams involved in the Special Counsel investigation (2017–present) led by Robert Mueller 
 Tom Grady, '82 – U.S. Representative from Florida
 Floyd McKissick Jr., '84 - North Carolina State Senator
 Manuel Sager, '85 – Swiss Ambassador to the United States
 Dave Trott, '85 – U.S. Representative from Michigan and fundraiser for the Republican National Committee
 Susan Bysiewicz, '86 – Lieutenant Governor of Connecticut, Former Connecticut Secretary of State
 David McKean, '86 – U.S. Ambassador to Luxembourg, former Director of Policy Planning
 Mike Turzai, '87 – Speaker of the House, Pennsylvania House of Representatives
 Claude Allen, '90 – former Assistant to the President for Domestic Policy
 John Jay Hoffman, '92 – Attorney General of New Jersey
 Michael Elston, '94 – former Chief of Staff & Counselor, Office of the Deputy Attorney General
 Darren Jackson, '96 - House Minority Leader, North Carolina House of Representatives
 Jerry Meek, '97 – former Chairman of the North Carolina Democratic Party
 Mike Levin, '05 - U.S. Representative from California
Marc Elias '93 - Partner at Perkins Coie LLP, General Counsel for Hillary Clinton's 2016 presidential campaign and for John Kerry's 2004 presidential campaign

Judiciary
 Cheri Beasley, LLM'18 – first Black female chief justice of the North Carolina Supreme Court
 Charles Becton, '69 – former Judge, North Carolina Court of Appeals
 Garrett Brown Jr., '68 – former Chief Judge, U.S. District Court for the District of New Jersey
 J. Michelle Childs, 'LLM '16, U.S. District Judge, U.S. District Court for the District of South Carolina
 Robert L. Clifford, '50 – former Associate Justice, Supreme Court of New Jersey
 Curtis Lynn Collier, '74 – senior U.S. District Judge, U.S. District Court for the Eastern District of Tennessee
 Colm Connolly, '91 – U.S. District Judge, U.S. District Court for the District of Delaware
 Timothy J. Corrigan, '81 – U.S. District Judge, U.S. District Court for the Middle District of Florida
 Mark A. Davis, 'LLM '18 – Associate Justice, North Carolina Supreme Court
 James C. Dever III, '87 – U.S. District Judge, U.S. District Court for the Eastern District of North Carolina
 Bernice B. Donald, LLM'18 – U.S. Circuit Judge, United States Court of Appeals for the Sixth Circuit
 Allyson Kay Duncan, '75 – retired U.S. Circuit Judge, U.S. Court of Appeals for the Fourth Circuit
 Christine Durham, '71 – first female Justice of the Utah Supreme Court
 Richard Gergel, '79 – U.S. District Judge, U.S. District Court for the District of South Carolina
 Paul W. Grimm, LLM'16 – U.S. District Judge, United States District Court for the District of Maryland
 David Gustafson, '81 – Judge, United States Tax Court
 Eva Guzman, LLM'14 – Texas Supreme Court Justice
 Todd M. Hughes, '92 – U.S. Circuit Judge, U.S. Court of Appeals for the Federal Circuit; first openly gay U.S. Circuit Court Judge
 Carolyn Kuhl, '77 – Judge, Los Angeles Superior Court
 Denise Majette, '79 – former U.S. Representative from Georgia,  former Georgia state judge
 Sarah A. L. Merriam, LLM'18, nominee, U.S. District Judge, United States District Court for the District of Connecticut
 Mandisa Maya, '90 – President of the Supreme Court of Appeal of South Africa
 Graham Calder Mullen, '69 – senior U.S. District Judge, U.S. District Court for the Western District of North Carolina
 David Nuffer, LLM'18 – U.S. District Judge, United States District Court for the District of Utah
 William H. Pauley III, '77 – senior U.S. District Judge, U.S. District Court for the Southern District of New York
 Jeremy B. Rosen, '97 - nominee, U.S. District Judge, U.S. District Court for the Central District of California
 Johnnie B. Rawlinson, LLM'16 - U.S. Circuit Judge, United States Court of Appeals for the Ninth Circuit
 Robin L. Rosenberg, '89 - U.S. District Judge, U.S. District Court for the Southern District of Florida
 Allison Jones Rushing, '07 – U.S. Circuit Judge, U.S. Court of Appeals for the Fourth Circuit
 Kenneth Starr, '73 – former U.S. Circuit Judge, U.S. Court of Appeals for the District of Columbia
 Gary S. Stein, '56 – former Associate Justice, Supreme Court of New Jersey
 Donna Stroud, 'LLM '14 – Judge, North Carolina Court of Appeals
 A. William Sweeney, '48 – former Justice, Supreme Court of Ohio
 Patricia Timmons-Goodson, 'LLM '14 – former Associate Justice, North Carolina Supreme Court
 Michael B. Thornton, '82 – Judge, United States Tax Court
 Gerald B. Tjoflat, '57 – U.S. Circuit Judge, U.S. Court of Appeals for the Eleventh Circuit
 Ernest C. Torres, '68 – retired U.S. District Judge, U.S. District Court for the District of Rhode Island
 Peter Verniero, '84 – former Associate Justice, Supreme Court of New Jersey & Former New Jersey Attorney General
 Sarah Hawkins Warren, '08 - Associate Justice, Georgia Supreme Court & Former Georgia Solicitor General
 Charles K. Wiggins, '76 – Associate Justice, Washington Supreme Court
 Don Willett, '92 LLM'16 – U.S. Circuit Judge, U.S. Court of Appeals for the Fifth Circuit & Former Texas Supreme Court Justice; famous, in part, for his social media commentary
Mary Ellen Coster Williams, '77 – Senior Judge, U.S. Court of Federal Claims

Academia
 Garrett Epps, '91 – Professor, University of Baltimore School of Law
 Pamela Gann, '73 – President, Claremont McKenna College (former Duke Law professor)
 Ben F. Johnson, '49 - Dean, Emory University School of Law and Georgia State University College of Law
 Ivan C. Rutledge –  Dean, Ohio State University Moritz College of Law.
 Rodney A. Smolla, '78 –  President, Furman University in South Carolina
 Michael Sorrell, '94 – President, Paul Quinn College in Texas
 Kenneth Starr, '73 – Former President of Baylor University and former Dean of Pepperdine University School of Law
 Zephyr Teachout, '99 – Professor, Fordham University School of Law

Business
 John Canning Jr., '69 – Co-founder of Madison Dearborn Partners, Co-owner of Milwaukee Brewers
 Gérard Louis-Dreyfus, '57 – Billionaire/Energy Magnate, Chairman of Louis Dreyfus Energy Services. Father of actress Julia Louis-Dreyfus
Happy R. Perkins, '80 – former Vice President and General Counsel, GE Energy
 Monty Sarhan, '99 – Publisher and CEO, Cracked Magazine
 Gao Xiqing, '86 – Vice Chairman, President, and Chief Investment Officer of the China Investment Corporation

Military
 Dan McCarthy, '83 – JAG Chief Prosecutor, United States Navy

Sports
Jim Drucker '76 - former ESPN Legal Correspondent, former Commissioner of the Continental Basketball Association, former Commissioner of the Arena Football League, and founder of NewKadia.com
 Drew Rosenhaus, '90 – Sports Agent/Owner of Rosenhause Sports
 Jay Bilas, '92 – ESPN Commentator and Former Duke Basketball Player and Coach
 Quin Snyder, '95 – Head Coach, Utah Jazz
 Zachary Kleiman, '13 - General Manager, Memphis Grizzlies

Arts and Entertainment
 Ben Fountain, '83 – Novelist, Billy Lynn's Long Halftime Walk
 Keith Lucas, attended – Academy Award-nominated writer and producer of Judas and the Black Messiah 
 Bascom Lamar Lunsford, 1913 – Folk musician
 Teddy Schwarzman, '06 – Academy Award-nominated film producer, The Imitation Game (son of Stephen A. Schwarzman)
 Angela Seo, '15 - Avant-garde musician best known for her work in experimental band Xiu Xiu
 David H. Steinberg, '93 – Writer/Director for film and television

Miscellaneous
 John H. Adams, '62 – Founding Director, Natural Resources Defense Council
 D. Todd Christofferson, '72 – Apostle, The Church of Jesus Christ of Latter-day Saints
 Matt Jones, '03 – radio host and controlling owner of Ohio Valley Wrestling
 Jeffrey Lichtman, '90 – Prominent criminal defense attorney
 Arlinda Locklear, '76 – lawyer, the first Native American woman to argue a case before the U.S. Supreme Court
 Gary Lynch, '75 – Chief Legal Officer, Morgan Stanley
 Tucker Max, '01 – Humorist and entrepreneur (associated with "fratire")
 Charlie Rose, '68 – journalist/TV host of the Charlie Rose Show on PBS
 Michael P. Scharf, '88 – professor of law and director of the Frederick K. Cox International Law Center at Case Western Reserve University School of Law

Fictional
 Lt. Colonel Sarah MacKenzie, USMC, portrayed by Catherine Bell on JAG, earned her law degree from Duke University School of Law.
 Sam Seaborn, portrayed by Rob Lowe on The West Wing, graduated from Duke Law School.

Deans of Duke Law School
1850 – 1882, Braxton Craven
1891 – 1894, A.C. Avery
1904 – 1927, Samuel Fox Mordecai
1927 – 1930, W. Bryan Bolich (acting)
1930 – 1934, Justin Miller
1934 – 1947, H. Claude Horack
1947 – 1949, Harold Sheperd
1949 – 1950, Charles L.B. Lowndes
1950 – 1956, Joseph A. McClain Jr.
1956 – 1957, Dale F. Stansbury (acting)
1957 – 1966, Elvin Latty
1966 – 1968, F. Hodge O'Neal
1968 – 1970, A. Kenneth Pye
1971 – 1973, Joseph Tyree Sneed III
1973 – 1976, A. Kenneth Pye
1976 – 1977, Walter Dellinger (acting)
1978 – 1988, Paul Carrington
1988 – 1999, Pamela Gann
1999 Clark C. Havighurst (interim)
2000 – 2007, Katharine T. Barlett
2007 – 2018, David F. Levi
2018 – present, Kerry Abrams

References

External links
 

Law, School of
Educational institutions established in 1868
Law schools in North Carolina
Duke University campus
1868 establishments in North Carolina